Mordellistena ermischi is a species of beetle in the genus Mordellistena of the family Mordellidae. It was described in 1966 by Compte and is found on Balearic Islands.

References

ermischi
Endemic fauna of the Balearic Islands
Beetles described in 1966